Adolf Leo Oppenheim (7 June 1904 – 21 July 1974), one of the most distinguished Assyriologists of his generation was editor-in-charge of the Chicago Assyrian Dictionary of the Oriental Institute from 1955 to 1974 and John A. Wilson Professor of Oriental Studies at the University of Chicago.

Oppenheim was born in Vienna, Austria, where he received his Ph.D. at the University of Vienna in 1933. His parents died in the Holocaust, and his wife, Elizabeth, barely escaped. Oppenheim and his wife emigrated to the United States. After a couple of lean years, he became a research associate at the University of Chicago in 1947, and he was made a faculty member in 1950. He became an associate editor of the university's Chicago Assyrian Dictionary in 1952. The dictionary had been planned since 1921, and it would eventually stretch to more than twenty published volumes. Assisted by Erica Reiner, Oppenheim remained editor-in-charge until his sudden death, still at the height of his intellectual powers.

E. A. Speiser once said that Oppenheim had read more cuneiform than any other living person; his deep knowledge of Akkadian informed his discerning view of Mesopotamian daily life and culture.
 
A. Leo Oppenheim's most famous work is Ancient Mesopotamia: Portrait of a Dead Civilization. His attempt to reform the field, embodied in Assyriology— Why and How?, was taken personally by some other Assyriologists. Its tone of pessimism at the impossible prospect of reviving a living understanding of Mesopotamian culture belied his personal optimism and sociability.

Works 
 
 
  (reprint )
 
  (edited by Erica Reiner and Johannes Renger)

Notes

External links 
 Oppenheim, Adolf Leo
Guide to the Adolf Leo and Elizabeth Oppenheim Papers 1988-1980 at the University of Chicago Special Collections Research Center

American Assyriologists
Austrian academics
Austrian Assyriologists
University of Chicago faculty
University of Vienna alumni
Jewish emigrants from Austria to the United States after the Anschluss
Writers from Vienna
1904 births
1974 deaths
20th-century Austrian historians
Corresponding Fellows of the British Academy